Creigiau railway station was a railway station in Creigiau in south Wales. It was on the Barry Railway between Efail Isaf and Wenvoe, which ran broadly north–south through Creigiau. To the east of the station, a second former line headed north-west towards Llantrisant, and south-east towards Cardiff. There was no connection between these lines; the Barry Railway line passed over the former Llantrisant and Taff Vale Junction Railway's and later Taff Vale Railway's Waterhall branch to the north of the station.  During the Second World War, the station was used to transfer American military to the nearby hospital at Rhydlafar. The Railway closed in 1962.

Both platforms remain, albeit rather overgrown. The site of the station buildings and yard is now used by a coach operator.

Future
A £135,000 study was announced in 2019 to inform a strategic outline business case for bringing the disused rail route from Llantrisant to Cardiff via Creigiau back into use as part of the South Wales Metro.  Any new service would operate tram-trains, which could run in battery mode.

References

Disused railway stations in Cardiff
Railway stations in Great Britain opened in 1896
Railway stations in Great Britain closed in 1962
Former Barry Railway stations
1896 establishments in Wales
1962 disestablishments in Wales